Got7, a K-pop boy group based in South Korea, have released five studio albums, sixteen EPs, twenty-two singles, and two box sets. Formed by JYP Entertainment in 2013, Got7 made their debut in January 2014 with the EP Got It?, which debuted at number two on the Gaon Albums Chart. The EP's lead single "Girls Girls Girls" peaked at number 21 on the Gaon Singles Chart. In October 2014, Got7 debuted in Japan with their first Japanese-language release "Around the World",  peaking at number three on the Oricon's singles charts. A month later, Got7 returned to Korea to release their first full-length album Identify, and topped the albums chart.

Albums

Studio albums

Reissues

Box sets

Extended plays

Singles

Other charted songs

Videography

Video albums

Music videos

Notes

References

External links
 GOT7 Korean discography  at JYP Entertainment 
 GOT7 Japanese discography  at Sony Music Japan

Discography
Discographies of South Korean artists
K-pop music group discographies